Santiago Lorenzo (born May 4, 1978 in Buenos Aires) is a retired decathlete from Argentina who competed for his native country at the 2004 Summer Olympics in Athens, Greece. He set his personal best score (7889 points) in Eugene, Oregon on May 31, 2001.

Personal life
Santiago Lorenzo moved to the United States in 1999 with a scholarship to run track for the University of Oregon.  In 2003, he graduated from University of Oregon with a BS in Exercise and Movement Science, in 2008 he graduated from University of Oregon with a Master of Science in Human Physiology, and earned a Ph.D in Integrative Physiology from University of Oregon in 2010.  His research focused on exercise and environmental physiology (essentially, understanding the physiological mechanisms by which heat/cold, or altitude affect exercise performance in athletes).
After finishing his doctorate in April 2010, he moved to Dallas, Texas for a postdoctoral fellowship at University of Texas Southwestern Medical Center.  He conducted research studies investigating mechanisms of shortness of breath with exertion in obese individuals until June 2012.  Currently he resides in Sarasota, Florida with his wife and two children, where he is a full-time faculty member at Lake Erie College of Osteopathic Medicine.

Achievements

References 
 sports-reference

1978 births
Living people
Argentine decathletes
Olympic athletes of Argentina
Athletes (track and field) at the 1999 Pan American Games
Athletes (track and field) at the 2003 Pan American Games
Athletes (track and field) at the 2004 Summer Olympics
Athletes from Buenos Aires
South American Games gold medalists for Argentina
South American Games medalists in athletics
Competitors at the 1998 South American Games
Pan American Games competitors for Argentina